The Team technical routine competition of the 2018 European Aquatics Championships was held on 6 August 2018.

Results
The final was started at 13:30.

References

Team technical routine